Bishorjan is a 2017 Bengali film written and directed by Kaushik Ganguly, produced by Opera Productions. It stars Abir Chatterjee, and Bangladeshi actress Jaya Ahsan. The story revolves around a love story between a Bangladeshi Hindu widow and Indian Muslim businessman, who one day washes up on the Bangladesh side of the Ichamati river.

The film was officially selected at the 2017 Hyderabad Bengali Film Festival and was released theatrically on 14 April 2017. It was a critical and commercial success. Bishorjan received six Filmfare East Awards, including Best Film, Best Director, Best Story, and Best Actress, as well as Best Feature Film in Bengali at the 64th National Film Awards.

Plot
The film opens as a young Hindu woman refuses to see Durga Bishorjon with her son. Bishorjon is a huge celebration, during which the two Bengals immerse their Durga idols in Ichamati River, which separates them. The young mother recalls memories of a Bishorjon in her past.

After the partition of India, Bengal was divided into East Pakistan (later Bangladesh), and West Bengal, a state in India. Border tensions rise, and the people from either side begin drifting apart. A Hindu widow, Padma, lives in a village on the Bangladeshi side with her aging father-in-law. One day, she saves a West Bengali Muslim man, Naseer, who had nearly drowned in the river during Durga Bishorjon, and cares for him. Naseer's presence in Bangladesh is illegal. To suppress any suspicion of his citizenship, they claim he is her cousin. Ganesh, a middle-aged jamidar man, as well as, an admirer of Padma's, who lives in her village, grows suspicious of Naseer. Padma and Naseer wonder how a river divided people of the same ethnicity and created differences between them.

Padma tries to find a way for Naseer to return to India. He reminds her of her husband, who died from excessive drinking. When Padma hears about Naseers's girlfriend, Ayesha, she is heartbroken. The two lonely souls fall for each other. Ganesh learns Naseer's identity and decides to keep watch on him. Naseer confesses to Padma that he lied about drowning during Durga Bishorjon, and reveals he has connections to the black market. Padma's father-in-law dies. Naseer worries about Padma's safety as a young widow alone in the village exposed to Ganesh's prying eyes. Padma tells him not to worry and to prepare to return to West Bengal. Ganesh makes a heartfelt confession of love to Padma. He promises to wait for her. Padma arranges Naseers's return to India but needs help. She accepts Ganesh's marriage proposal in exchange for his help in smuggling Naseer back to West Bengal.

The night before Naseer leaves, Padma gets drunk and bares her pain to Naseer. Distraught that Padma has to marry Ganesh because of him, he breaks down. Unable to control their feelings, the two make love. The next day, Padma bids a tearful goodbye to Naseer and sends him away with a gift for Ayesha. Naseer promises to end his business in the black market. Ganesh takes Padma to his house as Naseer leaves. Padma marries Ganesh, and it's Bijoya Doshomi. She refuses to go to see Bishorjon in Ichamati, and her little son leaves with Ganesh without her. At the end of the film it is revealed that her son is Naseers's, as both carry the same birthmark.

Cast
Jaya Ahsan as Padma
Abir Chatterjee as Nasir
Kaushik Ganguly as Ganesh Mandal
Lama as Lau

Accolades

Sequel 
Ganguly directed Bijoya, a sequel to Bishorjan, which released on 4 January 2019. Jaya Ahsan and Abir Chatterjee played the lead roles.

References

External links
 

Films directed by Kaushik Ganguly
Best Bengali Feature Film National Film Award winners
Indian drama films
Bengali-language Indian films
2010s Bengali-language films